Le Boudri (also known as Burgihorn) is a mountain of the Swiss Pennine Alps, located east of Ayer in the canton of Valais. It lies between the valleys of Anniviers and Turtmann, north of the Hirsihorn.

References

External links
 Le Boudri on Hikr

Mountains of the Alps
Alpine three-thousanders
Mountains of Switzerland
Mountains of Valais